Bertrand Madsen (born 18 May 1972) is a former professional tennis player from Haiti.

Career
Madsen was a quarter-finalist in the boys' singles event at the 1990 French Open.

After leaving the junior circuit, Madsen started out competing in the ATP Challenger Series, but in 1991 managed to qualify for the US Open. He was beaten in the first round by Todd Woodbridge. Later in the year he won a doubles title at the Challenger tournament in Casablanca.

Madsen played in a total of 27 Davis Cup ties for his country during his career, which is a national record. He won 33 matches out of 57, with a 22/17 record in singles and an 11/7 record in doubles rubbers.

Challenger titles

Doubles: (1)

References

1972 births
Living people
Haitian male tennis players